Edwin Stanton Dewees (born August 7, 1982 in Florence, South Carolina) is an American mixed martial artist who most recently competed in the Heavyweight division. A professional competitor from 2000 to 2014, he was featured on The Ultimate Fighter 4 and competed for the UFC, Affliction, King of the Cage, HDNet Fights, and the MFC.

MMA career and The Ultimate Fighter
In his quarter-final matchup on The Ultimate Fighter 4, Dewees dominated his first round against Gideon Ray, getting a take down and staying at guard for much of the round. However, in the second round, Dewees sustained a large cut in his forehead, forcing referee Herb Dean to call a timeout for the doctor to assess the cut due to the large amount of blood pouring from Dewees' head. After assessing the situation, the doctor allowed the fight to continue. At the end of the first two rounds, UFC President Dana White announced that the fight had been fought to a draw, therefore the fighters would go a third round.

In the third round, Dewees continued to bleed profusely, with blood continuously and steadily pouring from his wound.  The two fighters continued to grapple, rolling around in a pool of blood.  Ray was clearly distressed by the amount of blood, as Dewees lay atop him and punched with one hand and held the other one over the cut, attempting to alleviate the bleeding.  Dewees won the final round with a 10–9 decision.  This fight was perhaps the bloodiest battle ever witnessed on The Ultimate Fighter.  Dewees proceeded to the semi-finals, but was eliminated from the tournament by Patrick Côté by unanimous decision.

Dewees was featured on the undercard of The Ultimate Finale 4, where he lost to Jorge Rivera by first-round technical knockout.  After referee Yves Lavigne stopped the fight, Dewees sprang off the ground in protest of the stoppage.

Dewees was defeated by Antônio Rogério Nogueira at Affliction: Banned on July 19, 2008 via TKO, 4:06 of round 1.

Since losing to Antônio Rogério Nogueira at Affliction: Banned, Dewees has gone 3-5 in independent promotions.

Dewees is currently coaching and training at TNT Mixed Martial Arts Training Center in Phoenix, AZ

Personal life
Dewees has four children, a son born in 2007 and twin boys born in 2008, and a daughter born in 2015. He resides near Phoenix, Arizona. He attended and graduated from Cortez High School.

Mixed martial arts record

|-
| Loss
| align=center| 38–18 (1)
| Dale Sopi
| TKO (head kick and punches)
| Rage in the Cage 174
| 
| align=center| 1
| align=center| 1:54
| Phoenix, Arizona, United States
| 
|-
| Loss
| align=center| 38–17 (1)
| Lolohea Mahe
| KO (punch)
| Maui Fighting Championship 2012
| 
| align=center| 1
| align=center| N/A
| Kahului, Hawaii, United States
| 
|-
| Win
| align=center| 38–16 (1)
| Julian Hamilton
| TKO (punches)
| Rage in the Cage 163
| 
| align=center| 1
| align=center| 1:13
| Chandler, Arizona, United States
| 
|-
| Loss
| align=center| 37–16 (1)
| Luke Harris
| Submission (guillotine choke)
| MFC 33
| 
| align=center| 1
| align=center| 2:05
| Edmonton, Alberta, Canada
| 
|-
| Loss
| align=center| 37–15 (1)
| Jacen Flynn
| Submission (rear-naked choke)
| Bully's Fight Night 2
| 
| align=center| 1
| align=center| 0:44
| Lethbridge, Alberta, Canada
| 
|-
| Win
| align=center| 37–14 (1)
| Chuck Huus
| Submission (guillotine choke)
| TCF: Rumble at the Ranch
| 
| align=center| 1
| align=center| 0:29
| Glendale, Arizona, United States
| 
|-
| Loss
| align=center| 36–14 (1)
| Marcus Vänttinen
| TKO (punches)
| FF 30: Fight Festival 30
| 
| align=center| 1
| align=center| 3:13
| Helsinki, Finland
| 
|-
| Win
| align=center| 36–13 (1)
| Eric McElroy
| Submission (rear-naked choke)
| RITC: Rage In The Cage 133
| 
| align=center| 1
| align=center| 0:56
| Santa Ana Pueblo, New Mexico, United States
| 
|-
| Loss
| align=center| 35–13 (1)
| Antônio Rogério Nogueira
| TKO (punches)
| Affliction: Banned
| 
| align=center| 1
| align=center| 4:06
| Anaheim, California, United States
| 
|-
| Win
| align=center| 35–12 (1)
| Richard Blake
| Submission
| NLF: Redemption
| 
| align=center| 1
| align=center| 1:27
| Houston, Texas, United States
| 
|-
|  Loss
| align=center| 34–12 (1)
| Cory MacDonald
| TKO (punches)
| PFP: New Year's Restitution
| 
| align=center| 1
| align=center| 4:14
| Halifax, Nova Scotia, Canada
| 
|-
|  Loss
| align=center| 34–11 (1)
| Frank Trigg
| Submission (kimura)
| HDNet Fights: Reckless Abandon
| 
| align=center| 1
| align=center| 1:40
| Dallas, Texas, United States
| 
|-
| Loss
| align=center| 34–10 (1)
| Jorge Rivera
| TKO (punches)
| The Ultimate Fighter: The Comeback Finale
| 
| align=center| 1
| align=center| 2:37
| Las Vegas, Nevada, United States
| 
|-
| Loss
| align=center| 34–9 (1)
| Art Santore
| KO (punches)
| TC 13: Anarchy
| 
| align=center| 2
| align=center| 0:14
| Del Mar, California, United States
| 
|-
| Win
| align=center| 34–8 (1)
| Buckley Acosta
| Submission (triangle choke)
| KOTC: Outlaws
| 
| align=center| 1
| align=center| 0:56
| Globe, Arizona, United States
| 
|-
| Win
| align=center| 33–8 (1)
| Leo Sylvest
| Submission
| LOF 3: Legends of Fighting 3
| 
| align=center| 1
| align=center| N/A
| Indianapolis, Indiana, United States
| 
|-
| Loss
| align=center| 32–8 (1)
| Chris Leben
| Submission (armbar)
| UFC Ultimate Fight Night 2
| 
| align=center| 1
| align=center| 3:26
| Las Vegas, Nevada, United States
| 
|-
| Win
| align=center| 32–7 (1)
| Jason Geris
| TKO
| GC 41: Gladiator Challenge 41
| 
| align=center| 1
| align=center| 0:55
| Colusa, Arizona, United States
| 
|-
| Win
| align=center| 31–7 (1)
| Chance Williams
| Submission (rear-naked choke)
| KOTC 56: Caliente
| 
| align=center| 1
| align=center| 1:16
| Globe, Arizona, United States
| 
|-
| Win
| align=center| 30–7 (1)
| Rich Alten
| TKO (punches)
| RITC 70: Rage in the Cage 70
| 
| align=center| 1
| align=center| 0:49
| Phoenix, Arizona, United States
| 
|-
| Loss
| align=center| 29–7 (1)
| Rich Franklin
| TKO (punches and knees)
| UFC 44
| 
| align=center| 1
| align=center| 3:35
| Las Vegas, Nevada, United States
| 
|-
| Win
| align=center| 29–6 (1)
| Chappo Montijo
| Submission (choke)
| RITC 52: Rivalry
| 
| align=center| 1
| align=center| 0:27
| Phoenix, Arizona, United States
| 
|-
| Win
| align=center| 28–6 (1)
| Robert Beraun
| Submission (choke)
| RITC 49: Stare Down
| 
| align=center| 1
| align=center| 1:57
| Phoenix, Arizona, United States
| 
|-
| Win
| align=center| 27–6 (1)
| John Sullivan
| TKO (strikes)
| RITC 47: Unstoppable
| 
| align=center| 1
| align=center| 1:41
| Phoenix, Arizona, United States
| 
|-
| Win
| align=center| 26–6 (1)
| Auggie Padeken
| Submission (rear-naked choke)
| Rumble on the Rock 2: Rumble on the Rock 2
| 
| align=center| 1
| align=center| 2:13
| Honolulu, Hawaii, United States
| 
|-
| Win
| align=center| 25–6 (1)
| Homer Moore
| Decision (majority)
| RITC 45: Finally
| 
| align=center| 3
| align=center| 3:00
| Phoenix, Arizona, United States
| 
|-
| NC
| align=center| 24–6 (1)
| Todd Medina
| No Contest (overturned)
| RITC 43: The Match
| 
| align=center| 1
| align=center| 0:45
| Phoenix, Arizona, United States
| 
|-
| Win
| align=center| 24–6
| Sam Adkins
| Decision (unanimous)
| RITC 39: Bring It
| 
| align=center| 3
| align=center| 3:00
| Phoenix, Arizona, United States
| 
|-
| Win
| align=center| 23–6
| Shannon Ritch
| Submission (armbar)
| RITC 38: Let's Roll
| 
| align=center| 1
| align=center| 1:12
| Phoenix, Arizona, United States
| 
|-
| Win
| align=center| 22–6
| Joey Vigueria
| TKO (submission to punches)
| RITC 37: When Countries Collide
| 
| align=center| 1
| align=center| 0:21
| Phoenix, Arizona, United States
| 
|-
| Loss
| align=center| 21–6
| Drew Fickett
| Decision (unanimous)
| RITC 36: The Rematch
| 
| align=center| 3
| align=center| 3:00
| Phoenix, Arizona, United States
| 
|-
| Win
| align=center| 21–5
| Joe Grant
| TKO (submission to punches)
| RITC 35: This Time It's Personal
| 
| align=center| 1
| align=center| 1:16
| Phoenix, Arizona, United States
| 
|-
| Win
| align=center| 20–5
| Drew Fickett
| Decision (split)
| RITC 34: Rage in the Cage 34
| 
| align=center| 3
| align=center| 3:00
| Phoenix, Arizona, United States
| 
|-
| Win
| align=center| 19–5
| Brad Reynolds
| Submission (armbar)
| RITC 33: The Big Show
| 
| align=center| 1
| align=center| 1:05
| Phoenix, Arizona, United States
| 
|-
| Win
| align=center| 18–5
| Jesus Valdez
| Submission (choke)
| RITC 31: Rage in the Cage 31
| 
| align=center| 2
| align=center| 1:57
| Phoenix, Arizona, United States
| 
|-
| Win
| align=center| 17–5
| Randy Lavrar
| Submission (choke)
| RITC 30: Rage in the Cage 30
| 
| align=center| 1
| align=center| 1:09
| Phoenix, Arizona, United States
| 
|-
| Win
| align=center| 16–5
| George Lockhart
| Submission (choke)
| RITC 29: Rage in the Cage 29
| 
| align=center| 1
| align=center| 1:40
| Phoenix, Arizona, United States
| 
|-
| Loss
| align=center| 15–5
| Joe Stevenson
| Decision (unanimous)
| GC 4: Collision at Colusa
| 
| align=center| 3
| align=center| 5:00
| Colusa, California, United States
| 
|-
| Loss
| align=center| 15–4
| Jeremy Edwards
| Decision (unanimous)
| KOTC 8: Bombs Away
| 
| align=center| 2
| align=center| 5:00
| Williams, California, United States
| 
|-
| Win
| align=center| 15–3
| Christophe Leininger
| Decision (unanimous)
| RITC 26: Rage in the Cage 26
| 
| align=center| 3
| align=center| 3:00
| Phoenix, Arizona, United States
| 
|-
| Win
| align=center| 14–3
| Allan Sullivan
| Submission (armbar)
| RITC 25: Rage in the Cage 25
| 
| align=center| 1
| align=center| 2:30
| Phoenix, Arizona, United States
| 
|-
| Win
| align=center| 13–3
| Sean Williams
| Submission (armbar)
| RITC 24: Rage in the Cage 24
| 
| align=center| 1
| align=center| 1:38
| Phoenix, Arizona, United States
| 
|-
| Win
| align=center| 12–3
| Ryan Brown
| Submission (choke)
| RITC 23: Rage in the Cage 23
| 
| align=center| 1
| align=center| 0:45
| Phoenix, Arizona, United States
| 
|-
| Win
| align=center| 11–3
| Justin Antle
| TKO (submission to punches)
| rowspan=2|RITC Tucson 5: Rage in the Cage Tucson 5
| rowspan=2|
| align=center| 1
| align=center| 0:45
| rowspan=2|Tucson, Arizona, United States
| 
|-
| Win
| align=center| 10–3
| Kyle Deween
| TKO (submission to punches)
| align=center| 1
| align=center| 0:42
| 
|-
| Win
| align=center| 9–3
| Rudy Battista
| Submission (choke)
| RITC 22: Rage in the Cage 22
| 
| align=center| 1
| align=center| 0:47
| Phoenix, Arizona, United States
| 
|-
| Win
| align=center| 8–3
| Trinity Boykin
| Submission (triangle choke)
| rowspan=3|RITC 21: Rage in the Cage 21
| rowspan=3|
| align=center| 1
| align=center| 1:13
| rowspan=3|Phoenix, Arizona, United States
| 
|-
| Win
| align=center| 7–3
| Trinity Boykin
| Submission (triangle choke)
| align=center| 1
| align=center| 0:53
| 
|-
| Win
| align=center| 6–3
| Jeff Horlacher
| Submission (choke)
| align=center| 1
| align=center| 0:58
| 
|-
| Win
| align=center| 5–3
| Jesse Amado
| Submission (armbar)
| rowspan=2|RITC Tucson 4: Rage in the Cage Tucson 4
| rowspan=2|
| align=center| 1
| align=center| 1:06
| rowspan=2|Tucson, Arizona, United States
| 
|-
| Win
| align=center| 4–3
| Anthony Tarango
| TKO (submission to punches)
| align=center| 1
| align=center| 1:30
| 
|-
| Loss
| align=center| 3–3
| Antonio McKee
| Decision (unanimous)
| RITC 20: Rage in the Cage 20
| 
| align=center| 3
| align=center| 3:00
| Phoenix, Arizona, United States
| 
|-
| Win
| align=center| 3–2
| Matt Lynn
| TKO (submission to punches)
| RITC Tucson 3: Rage in the Cage Tucson 3
| 
| align=center| 1
| align=center| 0:30
| Tucson, Arizona, United States
| 
|-
| Loss
| align=center| 2–2
| David Harris
| Submission (armbar)
| RITC 19: Rage in the Cage 19
| 
| align=center| 2
| align=center| 1:52
| Phoenix, Arizona, United States
| 
|-
| Win
| align=center| 2–1
| MacArthur Blueback
| Submission (choke)
| RITC 18: Rage in the Cage 18
| 
| align=center| 1
| align=center| 0:29
| Phoenix, Arizona, United States
| 
|-
| Win
| align=center| 1–1
| Chris Meyers
| Submission (ankle lock)
| RITC 17: Rage in the Cage 17
| 
| align=center| 2
| align=center| 0:17
| Phoenix, Arizona, United States
| 
|-
| Loss
| align=center| 0–1
| Bill Cameron
| Submission (armbar)
| RITC 16: Rage in the Cage 16
| 
| align=center| 1
| align=center| 2:27
| Phoenix, Arizona, United States
|

References

External links
 Official Myspace Site
 Edwin "Bam Bam" Dewees Homepage
 
 

American male mixed martial artists
American sportspeople in doping cases
Mixed martial artists from Arizona
Mixed martial artists from South Carolina
Doping cases in mixed martial arts
Middleweight mixed martial artists
Ultimate Fighting Championship male fighters
Living people
1982 births